Upendra Man Singh (born 1973) is a Nepalese former footballer who played as a goalkeeper.

References

1973 births
Living people
Nepalese footballers
People from Bhaktapur
Three Star Club players
Manang Marshyangdi Club players
Nepal international footballers
Association football goalkeepers
Nepalese football managers
Nepalese expatriate sportspeople in India